Queen Blanche  is a painting by Finnish painter Albert Edelfelt completed in 1877.

The painting depicts a young blond woman depicting Queen Blanche of Namur (1320–1363), the wife of Swedish king Magnus Smek (1316–1374) with a boy riding on her knee.   

Albert Edelfelt painted the picture in Paris. 

The painting is on display at Ateneum in Helsinki, Finland.

References 

1877 paintings
Paintings by Albert Edelfelt
Paintings in the collection of the Ateneum
Paintings of people